Katja Haller (born 12 January 1981) is an Italian professional biathlete, who has been competing on the World Cup circuit since the 2001–02 season. She has had one second place and one third-place finishes in World Cup races. She has also competed in three Olympic Games, in Salt Lake City in 2002, in Turin in 2006 and in Vancouver in 2010.

Haller was born in Sterzing.

Further notable results
 2000: 3rd, Italian championships of biathlon, pursuit
 2002:
 3rd, Italian championships of biathlon, sprint
 3rd, Italian championships of biathlon, mass start
 2004: 2nd, Italian championships of biathlon, mass start
 2005:
 2nd, Italian championships of biathlon, sprint
 3rd, Italian championships of biathlon, pursuit
 2007:
 1st, Italian championships of biathlon, pursuit
 2nd, Italian championships of biathlon, sprint
 3rd, Italian championships of biathlon, mass start
 2008:
 3rd, Italian championships of biathlon, sprint
 3rd, Italian championships of biathlon, mass start
 2009:
 2nd, Italian championships of biathlon, sprint
 2nd, Italian championships of biathlon, pursuit
 2010: 2nd, Italian championships of biathlon, pursuit

References

External links
Katja Haller IBU Datacenter

1981 births
Living people
Sportspeople from Sterzing
Italian female biathletes
Olympic biathletes of Italy
Biathletes at the 2002 Winter Olympics
Biathletes at the 2006 Winter Olympics
Biathletes at the 2010 Winter Olympics
Germanophone Italian people